Plainedge is a hamlet and census-designated place (CDP) in the Town of Oyster Bay in Nassau County, on Long Island, in New York, United States. The population was 8,817 at the 2010 census.

The area was once known as Turkeyville.

Geography

Residents are served by the Bethpage (11714), Massapequa (11758), and Seaford (11783) Post Offices, with a small number of residents being served by the Farmingdale (11735) and Levittown (11756) Post Offices.

Demographics

2010 census
As of the 2010 census  the population of the CDP was 92% White, 86.6% Non-Hispanic White 0.8% African American, 0.2% Native American, 4.5% Asian, 0.0% Pacific Islander, 1.5% from other races, and 1% from two or more races. Hispanic or Latino of any race were 7.8% of the population.

2000 census
As of the census of 2000, there were 9,195 people, 3,028 households, and 2,458 families residing in the CDP. The population density was 6,425.8 per square mile (2,482.7/km2). There were 3,052 housing units at an average density of 2,132.9/sq mi (824.0/km2). The racial makeup of the CDP was 94.41% White, 0.54% African American, 0.10% Native American, 2.45% Asian, 0.03% Pacific Islander, 1.36% from other races, and 1.11% from two or more races. Hispanic or Latino of any race were 5.14% of the population.

There were 3,028 households, out of which 35.8% had children under the age of 18 living with them, 68.9% were married couples living together, 9.6% had a female householder with no husband present, and 18.8% were non-families. 15.5% of all households were made up of individuals, and 9.4% had someone living alone who was 65 years of age or older. The average household size was 3.03 and the average family size was 3.36.

In the CDP, the population was spread out, with 24.7% under the age of 18, 6.3% from 18 to 24, 30.8% from 25 to 44, 22.4% from 45 to 64, and 15.7% who were 65 years of age or older. The median age was 38 years. For every 100 females, there were 91.9 males. For every 100 females age 18 and over, there were 89.9 males.

The median income for a household in the CDP was $67,560, and the median income for a family was $75,588. Males had a median income of $55,091 versus $35,960 for females. The per capita income for the CDP was $25,752. About 1.7% of families and 2.4% of the population were below the poverty line, including 2.1% of those under age 18 and 4.8% of those age 65 or over.

Education
The hamlet is primarily served by the Plainedge Union Free School District. It currently consists of five schools: Eastplain, John H. West Memorial School, and Charles E. Schwarting elementary schools; Plainedge Middle School; and Plainedge High School.

The eastern portions of the hamlet are within the boundaries of the Farmingdale Union Free School District.

References 

Oyster Bay (town), New York
Census-designated places in New York (state)
Hamlets in New York (state)
Census-designated places in Nassau County, New York
Hamlets in Nassau County, New York